Father Oscar Lukefahr, C.M. (July 20, 1939 – August 10, 2015) was an American Catholic priest, theologian, writer, and Christian apologist. He is best known as the author of many introductory books and tracts on the subject of Catholicism, operating the Catholic Home Study Service from the Archdiocese of St. Louis. This service distributes free Catholic literature to thousands of RCIA students each year.

Lukefar is the nephew of Father Oscar Huber who administered last rites to President John F. Kennedy and consoled First Lady Jackie Kennedy after the president's assaination in 1963. Lukefar followed his uncle's footsteps in becoming a  Vincentian and a devout supporter of the Knights of Columbus.

List of books by Oscar Lukefahr
We Believe... A Survey Of The Catholic Faith
We Worship—A Guide To The Catholic Mass
The Search For Happiness
A Catholic Guide To The Bible
The Privilege Of Being Catholic
The Catechism Handbook
Christ's Mother And Ours

His publisher is currently Liguori Publications.

References

External links
Catholic Home Study Service
Congregation of the Mission
Liguori Publications

1939 births
2015 deaths
Roman Catholic activists
20th-century American Roman Catholic theologians
21st-century American Roman Catholic theologians
Vincentians